Pelé: Birth of a Legend is an American biographical film about the early life of Brazilian footballer Pelé and his journey with Brazil to win the 1958 FIFA World Cup. The film was directed and written by Jeff Zimbalist and Michael Zimbalist, starring Kevin de Paula, Vincent D'Onofrio, Rodrigo Santoro, Diego Boneta, with Colm Meaney, and a cameo of Pelé himself. The film focuses on the relationship between the character Pelé and his father. Filming took place in Rio de Janeiro between September 2013 late 2014. 

The film was released to a negative critical response, with film critics pointing out flaws in the narrative, criticising the lack of depth.

Plot
Under guidance from manager Vicente Feola (Vincent D'Onofrio), young Pelé (Kevin de Paula) utilizes his street football skills to lead Brazil to the World Cup in 1958.

Cast
 Kevin de Paula as Pelé
 Leonardo Lima Carvalho as 10-year-old Pelé
 Seu Jorge as Dondinho, a former footballer and Pelé's father
 Mariana Nunes as Celeste Arantes, Pelé's mother
 Vincent D'Onofrio as Vicente Feola, the head coach of the Brazil national team at the 1958 World Cup
 Milton Gonçalves as Waldemar de Brito, a former footballer and scout who discovered Pelé during the latter's early footballing days
 Diego Boneta as José "Mazzola" Altafini, a Palmeiras footballer of Italian descent who bullied Pelé in his youth
 Colm Meaney as George Raynor, the head coach of the Swedish national team at the 1958 World Cup
 Felipe Simas as Garrincha
 Fernando Caruso as Zito
 Rodrigo Santoro as a Brazilian announcer
 Pelé as a man sitting in the hotel lobby

Production

The principal photography of the film began in Rio de Janeiro on September 30, 2013. On February 9, 2014, it was announced that the film would not release at the time of the 2014 FIFA World Cup, because it was in post-production and doing some re-shoots.

The film was shot entirely on location in Brazil, with Leonardo Carvalho and Kevin de Paula playing the rising star at the age of 9 and 17, respectively. Pelé stated: "The two young actors who play my younger self will be true stars, as their skills both on screen and on the football pitch proved." Zimbalist stated that they wanted to concentrate on Pelé's early life for dramatic reasons, giving the reason as: "It was the birth of the legend that parallels the birth of the Brazilian national identity, coming off the 1950 (World Cup) loss (to Uruguay) in Maracanã". The film is centered on the relationship between Pelé and his father.

The Ginga Style 

Pelé's football style derives from Ginga.  As explained by the character De Brito:  "It is primitive, but it has a long and rich history ... It all started at the beginning of the 16th century ... The Portuguese arrived in Brazil with African slaves.  But the African's will was strong, and many escaped to the jungle. To protect themselves, the run away slaves called upon the ginga, the foundation of Capoeira, the martial art of war.  When slavery was finally abolished, the  capoeiraistas came out of the jungle, only to find that capoeira was outlawed throughout the land. They saw football to be the perfect way to practice ginga without being arrested. It was the ultimate form of ginga. And before long the ginga evolved, adapted, until it was no longer just ours, but all Brazilians.  But at the 1950 world cup, most believed our ginga style was to blame for the loss, and turned against anything associated with our African heritage. And just like your coach has been trying to remove ginga from your play, we have been trying to remove it from ourselves as a people ever since."

Reception 
The film received mostly negative reviews. Review aggregator Rotten Tomatoes gives the film a rating of 33%, based on 30 reviews, with an average rating of 5.04/10. On Metacritic, the film has a weighted average score of 39 out of 100, based on 11 critics, indicating "generally unfavorable reviews".

Critic Josh Terry of Deseret News said: "Overall, "Pelé: Birth of a Legend" is a solid sports film and a pleasant introduction to an international icon." However, he went on to add: "While "Birth of a Legend" touches on weighty subjects such as national identity and class tension, its tone often employs a frenetic highlight-reel style that gives its content more flash than depth." In his review for The Salt Lake Tribune, Sean P. Means awarded the film 2 out of 5 stars saying: "...the script plods along from event to event, and the young actors portraying Pelé are bland and uninvolving." Chief critic Alan Zilberman of The Washington Post concluded: "The film is too earnest and single-minded to be hagiographic, and the final moments are moving in spite of their predictable trajectories. ... the film would have benefitted if the Zimbalists had found a way to add a bit of depth — or even doubt — to the legend." Robert Abele of TheWrap stated the biopic "scores zero goals" calling the treatment to the script as "burnishing". In his review for The Village Voice, Michael Nordine expressed: "The new Pelé movie has great footwork but iffy, cheesy drama." Michael Rechtshaffen of The Los Angeles Times stated: "[. ... ] script fails to satisfy the dramatic requirements of a narrative feature." Andrew Barker of Variety commented: "The film is continually hamstrung by an uninspiring, ultra-traditionalist narrative."

Music 

The film score is composed by A. R. Rahman. In an interview with Press Trust of India, Rahman was quoted saying: "When I was approached for the project, I first Googled who Pelé was, because my life is all music. I saw amazing things about him and who he was. After that I read the script. I had tremendous respect for the project." In September 2014, Rahman recorded the tracks that featured singer Anna Beatriz. According to Rahman working on the Pelé project was intimidating but he found himself totally immersed in the Brazilian music, getting engaged in the character, in the lifestyle and setting of the movie. He added that sometime in his childhood, he had listened to lot of Brazilian music. The score and a couple of songs in this movie fall into western music genre. On recording the score, Rahman stated that he used instruments like the charango, the mandolin, and a lot of percussion and brass instruments from Brazil. So, the soundtrack is a mix of many elements with universal music that reflects Brazilian culture.

"Ginga" was a promotional track released as a video. The song was not initially a part of the screenplay, but came organically as Rahman was intrigued by the word 'Ginga', which is a style of playing football. Rahman stated: "Ginga was one of the main things how Pelé won a match. I found the word very interesting." By the time he finished recording the score, Rahman played the track to the makers who approved it. In India, the song was launched at PVR Cinemas in Mumbai on May 9, 2016. At the event, Rahman elaborated on how YouTube videos and the existing Brazilian sounds helped him design the soundtrack and the theme for the movie.

Track listing

Accolades
For the 89th Academy Awards, A. R. Rahman was shortlisted for nomination under Academy Award for Best Original Score among 145 candidates and the song "Ginga" produced by A. R. Rahman and performed by A. R. Rahman, Anna Beatriz and Aditya Rao has found its place among 91 contenders under  Academy Award for Best Original Song. The song didn't make the final list nominations announced on January 24, 2017, at Samuel Goldwyn Theater.

References

External links
 Pelé: Birth of a Legend – Official website
 
 
 

2016 films
American biographical drama films
Cultural depictions of Pelé
Imagine Entertainment films
Films set in Rio de Janeiro (city)
Films scored by A. R. Rahman
Sports films based on actual events
Biographical films about sportspeople
Brazilian biographical drama films
Films set in 1958
Portuguese-language films
Brazilian association football films
2010s American films